Koninklijke Philips N.V., commonly shortened to Philips, is a Dutch multinational conglomerate corporation that was founded in Eindhoven in 1891. Since 1997, it has been mostly headquartered in Amsterdam, though the Benelux headquarters is still in Eindhoven. Philips was formerly one of the largest electronics companies in the world, but is currently focused on the area of health technology, having divested its other divisions.

The company was founded in 1891 by Gerard Philips and his father Frederik, with their first products being light bulbs. It currently employs around 80,000 people across 100 countries. The company gained its royal honorary title (hence the Koninklijke) in 1998 and dropped the "Electronics" in its name in 2013, due to its refocusing from consumer electronics to healthcare technology.

Philips is organized into three main divisions: Personal Health (formerly Philips Consumer Electronics and Philips Domestic Appliances and Personal Care), Connected Care, and Diagnosis & Treatment (formerly Philips Medical Systems). The lighting division was spun off as a separate company, Signify N.V.

The company started making electric shavers in 1939 under the Philishave and Norelco brands, and post-war they developed the Compact Cassette format and co-developed the Compact Disc format with Sony, as well as numerous other technologies. As of 2012, Philips was the largest manufacturer of lighting in the world as measured by applicable revenues.

Philips has a primary listing on the Euronext Amsterdam stock exchange and is a component of the Euro Stoxx 50 stock market index. It has a secondary listing on the New York Stock Exchange. Acquisitions include that of Signetics and Magnavox. It also founded a multidisciplinary sports club called PSV Eindhoven in 1913.

History

The Philips Company was founded in 1891, by Dutch entrepreneur Gerard Philips and his father Frederik Philips. Frederik, a banker based in Zaltbommel, financed the purchase and setup of an empty factory building in Eindhoven, where the company started the production of carbon-filament lamps and other electro-technical products in 1892. This first factory has since been adapted and is used as a museum.

In 1895, after a difficult first few years and near-bankruptcy, the Philipses brought in Anton, Gerard's younger brother by sixteen years. Though he had earned a degree in engineering, Anton started work as a sales representative; soon, however, he began to contribute many important business ideas. With Anton's arrival, the family business began to expand rapidly, resulting in the founding of Philips Metaalgloeilampfabriek N.V. (Philips Metal Filament Lamp Factory Ltd.) in Eindhoven in 1908, followed in 1912, by the foundation of Philips Gloeilampenfabrieken N.V. (Philips Lightbulb Factories Ltd.). After Gerard and Anton Philips changed their family business by founding the Philips corporation, they laid the foundations for the later multinational.

In the 1920s, the company started to manufacture other products, such as vacuum tubes.

In 1924, Philips joined with German lamp trust Osram to form the Phoebus cartel.

Radio 

On 11 March 1927, Philips went on the air, inaugurating the shortwave radio station PCJJ (later PCJ) which was joined in 1929 by a sister station (Philips Omroep Holland-Indië, later PHI). PHOHI broadcast in Dutch to the Dutch East Indies (now Indonesia), and later PHI broadcast in English and other languages to the Eastern hemisphere, while PCJJ broadcast in English, Spanish and German to the rest of the world.

The international program Sundays commenced in 1928, with host Eddie Startz hosting the Happy Station show, which became the world's longest-running shortwave program. Broadcasts from the Netherlands were interrupted by the German invasion in May 1940. The Germans commandeered the transmitters in Huizen to use for pro-Nazi broadcasts, some originating from Germany, others concerts from Dutch broadcasters under German control.

In the early 1930s, Philips introduced the "Chapel", a radio with a built-in loudspeaker.

Philips Radio was absorbed shortly after liberation when its two shortwave stations were nationalised in 1947 and renamed Radio Netherlands Worldwide, the Dutch International Service. Some PCJ programs, such as Happy Station, continued on the new station.

Stirling engine
Philips was instrumental in the revival of the Stirling engine when, in the early 1930s, the management decided that offering a low-power portable generator would assist in expanding sales of its radios into parts of the world where mains electricity was unavailable and the supply of batteries uncertain. Engineers at the company's research lab carried out a systematic comparison of various power sources and determined that the almost forgotten Stirling engine would be most suitable, citing its quiet operation (both audibly and in terms of radio interference) and ability to run on a variety of heat sources (common lamp oil – "cheap and available everywhere" – was favoured). They were also aware that, unlike steam and internal combustion engines, virtually no serious development work had been carried out on the Stirling engine for many years and asserted that modern materials and know-how should enable great improvements.

By the late 1940s, the 'Type 10' was ready to be handed over to Philips's subsidiary Johan de Witt in Dordrecht to be produced and incorporated into a generator set as originally planned. Production of an initial batch of 250 began in 1951, but it became clear that they could not be made at a competitive price, besides the advent of transistor radios with their much lower power requirements meant that the original rationale for the set was disappearing. Approximately 150 of these sets were eventually produced.

In parallel with the generator set, Philips developed experimental Stirling engines for a wide variety of applications and continued to work in the field until the late 1970s, though the only commercial success was the 'reversed Stirling engine' cryocooler. However, they filed a large number of patents and amassed a wealth of information, which they later licensed to other companies.

Shavers
The first Philips shaver was introduced in 1939, and was simply called Philishave. In the US, it was called Norelco. The Philishave has remained part of the Philips product line-up until the present.

World War II
On 9 May 1940, the Philips directors learned that the German invasion of the Netherlands was to take place the following day. Having prepared for this, Anton Philips and his son-in-law Frans Otten, as well as other Philips family members, fled to the United States, taking a large amount of the company capital with them. Operating from the US as the North American Philips Company, they managed to run the company throughout the war. At the same time, the company was moved (on paper) to the Netherlands Antilles to keep it out of German hands.

On 6 December 1942, the British No. 2 Group RAF undertook Operation Oyster, which heavily damaged the Philips Radio factory in Eindhoven with few casualties among the Dutch workers and civilians. The Philips works in Eindhoven was bombed again by the RAF on 30 March 1943.

Frits Philips, the son of Anton, was the only Philips family member to stay in the Netherlands. He saved the lives of 382 Jews by convincing the Nazis that they were indispensable for the production process at Philips. In 1943, he was held at the internment camp for political prisoners at Vught for several months because a strike at his factory reduced production. For his actions in saving the hundreds of Jews, he was recognized by Yad Vashem in 1995 as a "Righteous Among the Nations".

1945–1999 
After the war, the company was moved back to the Netherlands, with their headquarters in Eindhoven.

In 1949, the company began selling television sets. In 1950, it formed Philips Records, which eventually formed part of PolyGram in 1962.

Philips introduced the Compact Cassette audio tape format in 1963, and it was wildly successful. Cassettes were initially used for dictation machines for office typing stenographers and professional journalists. As their sound quality improved, cassettes would also be used to record sound and became the second mass media alongside vinyl records used to sell recorded music.

Philips introduced the first combination portable radio and cassette recorder, which was marketed as the "radio recorder", and is now better known as the boom box. Later, the cassette was used in telephone answering machines, including a special form of cassette where the tape was wound on an endless loop. The C-cassette was used as the first mass storage device for early personal computers in the 1970s and 1980s. Philips reduced the cassette size for professional needs with the Mini-Cassette, although it would not be as successful as the Olympus Microcassette.  This became the predominant dictation medium up to the advent of fully digital dictation machines. Philips continued with computers through the early 1990s (see separate article: Philips Computers).

In 1972, Philips launched the world's first home video cassette recorder, in the UK, the N1500. Its relatively bulky video cassettes could record 30 minutes or 45 minutes. Later one-hour tapes were also offered. As the competition came from Sony's Betamax and the VHS group of manufacturers, Philips introduced the N1700 system which allowed double-length recording. For the first time, a 2-hour movie could fit onto one video cassette.  In 1977, the company unveiled a special promotional film for this system in the UK, featuring comedy writer and presenter Denis Norden. The concept was quickly copied by the Japanese makers, whose tapes were significantly cheaper. Philips made one last attempt at a new standard for video recorders with the Video 2000 system, with tapes that could be used on both sides and had 8 hours of total recording time. As Philips only sold its systems on the PAL standard and in Europe, and the Japanese makers sold globally, the scale advantages of the Japanese proved insurmountable and Philips withdrew the V2000 system and joined the VHS Coalition.

Philips had developed a LaserDisc early on for selling movies, but delayed its commercial launch for fear of cannibalizing its video recorder sales. Later Philips joined with MCA to launch the first commercial LaserDisc standard and players. In 1982, Philips teamed with Sony to launch the Compact Disc; this format evolved into the CD-R, CD-RW, DVD and later Blu-ray, which Philips launched with Sony in 1997 and 2006 respectively.

In 1984, the Dutch Philips Group bought out nearly a one-third share and took over the management of the German company Grundig.

In 1984, Philips split off its activities on the field of photolithographic integrated circuit production equipment, the so-called wafer steppers, into a joint venture with ASM International, located in Veldhoven under the name ASML. Over the years, this new company has evolved into the world's leading manufacturer of chip production machines at the expense of competitors like Nikon and Canon.

Philips partnered with Sony again later to develop a new "interactive" disc format called CD-i, described by them as a "new way of interacting with a television set". Philips created the majority of CD-i compatible players. After low sales, Philips repositioned the format as a video game console, but it was soon discontinued after being heavily criticized amongst the gaming community.

In the 1980s, Philips's profit margin dropped below 1 percent, and in 1990 the company lost more than US$2 billion (biggest corporate loss in Dutch history). Troubles for the company continued into the 1990s as its status as a leading electronics company was swiftly lost.

In 1985, Philips was the largest founding investor in TSMC which was established as a joint venture between Philips, the Taiwan government and other private investors.

In 1991, the company's name was changed from N.V. Philips Gloeilampenfabrieken to Philips Electronics N.V. At the same time, North American Philips was formally dissolved, and a new corporate division was formed in the US with the name Philips Electronics North America Corp.

In 1997, the company officers decided to move the headquarters from Eindhoven to Amsterdam along with the corporate name change to Koninklijke Philips Electronics N.V., the latter of which was finalized on 16 March 1998.

In 1998, looking to spur innovation, Philips created an Emerging Businesses group for its Semiconductors unit, based in Silicon Valley. The group was designed to be an incubator where promising technologies and products could be developed.

2000s 
The move of the headquarters to Amsterdam was completed in 2001. Initially, the company was housed in the Rembrandt Tower. In 2002, it moved again, this time to the Breitner Tower. Philips Lighting, Philips Research, Philips Semiconductors (spun off as NXP in September 2006), and Philips Design, are still based in Eindhoven. Philips Healthcare is headquartered in both Best, Netherlands (near Eindhoven) and Andover, Massachusetts, United States (near Boston).

In 2000, Philips bought Optiva Corporation, the maker of Sonicare electric toothbrushes. The company was renamed Philips Oral Healthcare and made a subsidiary of Philips DAP. In 2001, Philips acquired Agilent Technologies' Healthcare Solutions Group (HSG) for EUR 2 billion. Philips created a computer monitors joint venture with LG called LG.Philips Displays in 2001.

In 2001, after growing the unit's Emerging Businesses group to nearly $1 billion in revenue, Scott A. McGregor was named the new president and CEO of Philips Semiconductors. McGregor's appointment completed the company's shift to having dedicated CEOs for all five of the company's product divisions, which would in turn leave the Board of Management to concentrate on issues confronting the Philips Group as a whole.

In February 2001 Philips sold its remaining interest in battery manufacturing to its then partner Matsushita (which itself became Panasonic in 2008).

In 2004, Philips abandoned the slogan "Let's make things better" in favour of a new one: "Sense and Simplicity".

In December 2005, Philips announced its intention to sell or demerge its semiconductor division. On 1 September 2006, it was announced in Berlin that the name of the new company formed by the division would be NXP Semiconductors. On 2 August 2006, Philips completed an agreement to sell a controlling 80.1% stake in NXP Semiconductors to a consortium of private equity investors consisting of Kohlberg Kravis Roberts & Co. (KKR), Silver Lake Partners and AlpInvest Partners. On 21 August 2006, Bain Capital and Apax Partners announced that they had signed definitive commitments to join the acquiring consortium, a process which was completed on 1 October 2006.

In 2006, Philips bought out the company Lifeline Systems headquartered in Framingham, Massachusetts, in a deal valued at $750 million, its biggest move yet to expand its consumer-health business (M). In August 2007, Philips acquired the company Ximis, Inc. headquartered in El Paso, Texas, for their Medical Informatics Division. In October 2007, it purchased a Moore Microprocessor Patent (MPP) Portfolio license from The TPL Group.

On 21 December 2007, Philips and Respironics, Inc. announced a definitive agreement pursuant to which Philips acquired all of the outstanding shares of Respironics for US$66 per share, or a total purchase price of approximately €3.6  billion (US$5.1 billion) in cash.

On 21 February 2008, Philips completed the acquisition of VISICU in Baltimore, Maryland, through the merger of its indirect wholly-owned subsidiary into VISICU. As a result of that merger, VISICU has become an indirect wholly-owned subsidiary of Philips. VISICU was the creator of the eICU concept of the use of Telemedicine from a centralized facility to monitor and care for ICU patients.

The Philips physics laboratory was scaled down in the early 21st century, as the company ceased trying to be innovative in consumer electronics through fundamental research.

2010s 
Philips made several acquisitions during 2011, announcing on 5 January 2011 that it had acquired Optimum Lighting, a manufacturer of LED based luminaires. In January 2011, Philips agreed to acquire the assets of Preethi, a leading India-based kitchen appliances company. On 27 June 2011, Philips acquired Sectra Mamea AB, the mammography division of Sectra AB.

Because net profit slumped 85 percent in Q3 2011, Philips announced a cut of 4,500 jobs to match part of an €800 million ($1.1 billion) cost-cutting scheme to boost profits and meet its financial target. In 2011, the company posted a loss of €1.3 billion, but earned a net profit in Q1 and Q2 2012, however the management wanted €1.1 billion cost-cutting which was an increase from €800 million and may cut another 2,200 jobs until end of 2014.
In March 2012, Philips announced its intention to sell, or demerge its television manufacturing operations to TPV Technology.

Following two decades in decline, Philips went through a major restructuring, shifting its focus from electronics to healthcare. Particularly from 2011 when a new CEO was appointed, Frans van Houten. The new health and medical strategy have helped Philips to thrive again in the 2010s.

On 5 December 2012, the antitrust regulators of the European Union fined Philips and several other major companies for fixing prices of TV cathode-ray tubes in two cartels lasting nearly a decade.

On 29 January 2013, it was announced that Philips had agreed to sell its audio and video operations to the Japan-based Funai Electric for €150 million, with the audio business planned to transfer to Funai in the latter half of 2013, and the video business in 2017. As part of the transaction, Funai was to pay a regular licensing fee to Philips for the use of the Philips brand. The purchase agreement was terminated by Philips in October because of breach of contract and the consumer electronics operations remain under Philips. Philips said it would seek damages for breach of contract in the US$200-million sale. In April 2016, the International Court of Arbitration ruled in favour of Philips, awarding compensation of €135 million in the process.

In April 2013, Philips announced a collaboration with Paradox Engineering for the realization and implementation of a "pilot project" on network-connected street-lighting management solutions. This project was endorsed by the San Francisco Public Utilities Commission (SFPUC).

In 2013, Philips removed the word "Electronics" from its name – becoming Royal Philips N.V. On 13 November 2013, Philips unveiled its new brand line "Innovation and You" and a new design of its shield mark. The new brand positioning is cited by Philips to signify company's evolution and emphasize that innovation is only meaningful if it is based on an understanding of people's needs and desires.

On 28 April 2014, Philips agreed to sell their Woox Innovations subsidiary (consumer electronics) to Gibson Brands for $US135 million. On 23 September 2014, Philips announced a plan to split the company into two, separating the lighting business from the healthcare and consumer lifestyle divisions. It moved to complete this in March 2015 to an investment group for $3.3 billion.

In February 2015, Philips acquired Volcano Corporation to strengthen its position in non-invasive surgery and imaging. In June 2016, Philips spun off its lighting division to focus on the healthcare division. In June 2017, Philips announced it would acquire US-based Spectranetics Corp, a manufacturer of devices to treat heart disease, for €1.9 billion (£1.68 billion) expanding its current image-guided therapy business.

In May 2016, Philips' lighting division Philips Lighting went through a spin-off process, and became an independent public company named Philips Lighting N.V.

In 2017, Philips launched Philips Ventures, with a health technology venture fund as its main focus. Philips Ventures invested in companies including Mytonomy (2017) and DEARhealth (2019).

On July 18th, 2017, Philips announced its acquisition of TomTec Imaging Systems GmbH. 

In 2018, the independent Philips Lighting N.V. was renamed Signify N.V. However, it continues to produce and market Philips-branded products such as Philips Hue color-changing LED light bulbs.

2020s 
In 2022, Philips announced that Frans Van Houten, who had served as CEO for 12 years would be stepping down and was to be replaced by Philips's EVP and Chief Business Leader of Connected Care, Roy Jakobs, effective October 15, 2022.

In 2023, the company announced that it would be cutting 6,000 jobs from the company worldwide over the next two years after reporting 1.6 billion euros in losses during the 2022 financial year. The cuts came in addition to a 4,000 staff reduction being announced in October 2022.

Corporate affairs

CEOs
Past and present CEOs:
 1891–1922: Gerard Philips
 1922–1939: Anton Philips
 1939–1961: Frans Otten
 1961–1971: Frits Philips
 1971–1977: 
 1977–1981: Nico Rodenburg
 1981–1982: Cor Dillen
 1982–1986: Wisse Dekker
 1986–1990: Cor van der Klugt
 1990–1996: Jan Timmer
 1996–2001: Cor Boonstra
 2001–2011: Gerard Kleisterlee
 2011–2022: Frans van Houten
 2022–present: Roy Jakobs

CEOs lighting:
2003–2008: Theo van Deursen
2012–present: Eric Rondolat

CFOs
Past and present CFOs (chief financial officer)
 1960–1968: Cor Dillen
 –1997: Dudley Eustace
 1997–2005: Jan Hommen
 2015–present: Abhijit Bhattacharya

Current Executive Committee

CEO: Roy Jakobs
CFO: Abhijit Bhattacharya
COO: Willem Appelo
Chief ESG & Legal Officer: Marnix van Ginneken
Chief Patient Safety and Quality Officer: Steve C da Baca
Chief Business Leader (Connected Care): Roy Jakobs
Chief Business Leader (Personal Health): Deeptha Khanna
Chief Business Leader (Image Guided Therapy): Bert van Meurs
Chief Business Leader (Precision Diagnosis): Bert van Meurs (ad interim)
CEO Philips Domestic Appliances: Henk Siebren de Jong
Chief of International Markets: Edwin Paalvast
Chief Medical, Innovation & Strategy Officer: Shez Partovi
Chief Market Leader (Greater China): Andy Ho
Chief Market Leader (North America): Jeff DiLullo
Chief Human Resources Officer: Daniela Seabrook

Acquisitions
Companies acquired by Philips through the years include ADAC Laboratories, Agilent Healthcare Solutions Group, Amperex, ATL Ultrasound, EKCO, Lifeline Systems, Magnavox, Marconi Medical Systems, Philips Medical purchased Intermagnetics based out of Latham, New York for 1.3 billion in 2006, Optiva, Preethi, Pye, Respironics, Inc., Sectra Mamea AB, Signetics, VISICU, Volcano, VLSI, Ximis, portions of Westinghouse and the consumer electronics operations of Philco and Sylvania. Philips abandoned the Sylvania trademark which is now owned by Havells Sylvania except in Australia, Canada, Mexico, New Zealand, Puerto Rico and the US where it is owned by Osram. Formed in November 1999 as an equal joint venture between Philips and Agilent Technologies, the light-emitting diode manufacturer Lumileds became a subsidiary of Philips Lighting in August 2005 and a fully owned subsidiary in December 2006. An 80.1 percent stake in Lumileds was sold to Apollo Global Management in 2017.

On 18 July 2017, Philips announced it's acquisition of TomTec Imaging Systems GmbH

On 19 September 2018, Philips reported that it had acquired US-based Blue Willow Systems, a developer of a cloud-based senior living community resident safety platform.

On 7 March 2019, Philips announced that was acquiring the Healthcare Information Systems business of Carestream Health Inc., a US-based provider of medical imaging and healthcare IT solutions for hospitals, imaging centers, and specialty medical clinics.

On 18 July 2019, Philips announced that it has expanded its patient management solutions in the US with the acquisition of Boston-based start-up company Medumo.

On 27 August 2020, Philips announced the acquisition of Intact Vascular, Inc., a U.S.-based developer of medical devices for minimally invasive peripheral vascular procedures.

On 18 December 2020, Philips and BioTelemetry, Inc., a leading U.S.-based provider of remote cardiac diagnostics and monitoring, announced that they had entered into a definitive merger agreement.

On 19 January 2021, Philips announced the acquisition of Capsule Technologies, Inc., a provider of medical device integration and data technologies for hospitals and healthcare organizations.

On 9 November 2021, Philips announced the acquisition of Cardiologs, an AI-powered cardiac diagnostic technology developer, to expand its cardiac diagnostics and monitoring portfolio.

Operations
Philips is registered in the Netherlands as a naamloze vennootschap (public corporation) and has its global headquarters in Amsterdam. At the end of 2013, Philips had 111 manufacturing facilities, 59 R&D facilities across 26 countries and sales and service operations in around 100 countries.

Philips is organized into three main divisions: Philips Consumer Lifestyle (formerly Philips Consumer Electronics and Philips Domestic Appliances and Personal Care), Philips Healthcare (formerly Philips Medical Systems), and Philips Lighting (Former). Philips achieved total revenues of €22.579 billion in 2011, of which €8.852 billion were generated by Philips Healthcare, €7.638 billion by Philips Lighting, €5.823 billion by Philips Consumer Lifestyle and €266 million from group activities. At the end of 2011, Philips had a total of 121,888 employees, of whom around 44% were employed in Philips Lighting, 31% in Philips Healthcare and 15% in Philips Consumer Lifestyle. The lighting division was spun out as a new company called Signify, which uses the Philips brand under license.

Philips invested a total of €1.61 billion in research and development in 2011, equivalent to 7.10% of sales. Philips Intellectual Property and Standards is the group-wide division responsible for licensing, trademark protection and patenting. Philips currently holds around 54,000 patent rights, 39,000 trademarks, 70,000 design rights and 4,400 domain name registrations. In the 2021 review of WIPO's annual World Intellectual Property Indicators Philips ranked 5th in the world for its 95 industrial design registrations being published under the Hague System during 2020. This position is down on their previous 4th-place ranking for 85 industrial design registrations being published in 2019.

Asia

Thailand
Philips Thailand was established in 1952. It is a subsidiary that produces healthcare, lifestyle, and lighting products. Philips started manufacturing in Thailand in 1960 with an incandescent lamp factory. Philips has diversified its production facilities to include a fluorescent lamp factory and a luminaries factory, serving Thai and worldwide markets.

Hong Kong

Philips Hong Kong began operations in 1948. Philips Hong Kong houses the global headquarters of Philips' Audio Business Unit. It also house Philips' Asia Pacific regional office and headquarters for its Design Division, Domestic Appliances & Personal Care Products Division, Lighting Products Division and Medical System Products Division.

In 1974, Philips opened a lamp factory in Hong Kong. This has a capacity of 200 million pieces a year and is certified with ISO 9001:2000 and ISO 14001. Its product portfolio includes prefocus, lensend and E10 miniature light bulbs.

China
Philips established its first Chinese factory in Zhuhai, Guangdong, in 1990. The site mainly manufactures Philishaves and healthcare products. In early 2008, Philips Lighting, a division of Royal Philips Electronics, opened a small engineering center in Shanghai to adapt the company's products to vehicles in Asia. Today Philips has 27 WOFE/JVs in China, employing >17,500 people. China is its second largest market.

India
Philips began operations in India in 1930, with the establishment of Philips Electrical Co. (India) Pvt Ltd in Kolkata as a sales outlet for imported Philips lamps. In 1938, Philips established its first Indian lamp manufacturing factory in Kolkata. In 1948, Philips started manufacturing radios in Kolkata. In 1959, a second radio factory was established near Pune. This was closed and sold around 2006. In 1957, the company converted into a public limited company, renamed "Philips India Ltd". In 1970, a new consumer electronics factory began operations in Pimpri near Pune. This is now called the 'Philips Healthcare Innovation Centre'. Also, a manufacturing facility 'Philips Centre for Manufacturing Excellence' was set up in Chakan, Pune in 2012. In 1996, the Philips Software Centre was established in Bangalore, later renamed the Philips Innovation Campus. In 2008, Philips India entered the water purifier market. In 2014, Philips was ranked 12th among India's most trusted brands according to the Brand Trust Report, a study conducted by Trust Research Advisory.
Now Philips India is one of the most diversified health care company & broadly focusing on Imaging, Utlrasound, MA & TC products & Sleep & respiratory care products. Philips is aspiring to touch life of 40 Million patients in India by next 2 years. In 2020, Philips introduced mobile ICUs in order to support clinicians to meet the rising demand of ICU beds due to the COVID-19 pandemic.

Israel
Philips has been active in Israel since 1948 and in 1998, set up a wholly owned subsidiary, Philips Electronics (Israel) Ltd. The company has over 700 employees in Israel and generated sales of over $300 million in 2007.

Philips Medical Systems Technologies Ltd. (Haifa) is a developer and manufacturer of Computerized Tomography (CT), diagnostic and Medical Imaging systems. The company was founded in 1969 as Elscint by Elron Electronic Industries and was acquired by Marconi Medical Systems in 1998, which was itself acquired by Philips in 2001.

Philips Semiconductors formerly had major operations in Israel; these now form part of NXP Semiconductors.

On 1 August 2019, Philips acquired Carestream HCIS division from Onex Corporation. As part of the acquisition, Algotec Systems LTD (Carestream HCIS R&D) located in Raanana Israel changed ownership in a share deal. In addition to that, Algotec changed its name to Philips Algotec and is part of Philips HCIS. Philips HCIS is a provider of medical imaging systems.

Pakistan
Philips has been active in Pakistan since 1948 and has a wholly owned subsidiary, Philips Pakistan Limited (Formerly Philips Electrical Industries of Pakistan Limited).

The head office is in Karachi with regional sales offices in Lahore and Rawalpindi.

Singapore

Philips began operations in Singapore in 1951, initially as a local distributor of imported Philips products. Philips later established manufacturing sites at Boon Keng Road and Jurong Industrial Estate in 1968 and 1970 respectively. Since 1972, its regional headquarters has been based in the central HDB town of Toa Payoh, which from the 1990s until the early 2010s consisted of four interconnected buildings housing offices and factory spaces. In 2016, a new Philips APAC HQ building was opened on the site of one of the former 1972 buildings.

Europe

Denmark
Philips Denmark was founded in Copenhagen in 1927, and is now headquartered in Frederiksberg.

In 1963, Philips established the Philips TV & Test Equipment laboratory in Brøndby Municipality which was where engineers Erik Helmer Nielsen and Finn Hendil (da; 1939–2011) created and developed some of Philips' most iconic television test cards, such as the monochrome PM5540 and the colour PM5544 and TVE test cards. Between 2000 and 2012, Philips TV & Test Equipment gradually became independent from Philips and renamed itself as ProTelevision Technologies, now under the umbrella of the Italian company Elenos Group.

France

Philips France has its headquarters in Suresnes. The company employs over 3600 people nationwide.

Philips Lighting has manufacturing facilities in Chalon-sur-Saône (fluorescent lamps), Chartres (automotive lighting), Lamotte-Beuvron (architectural lighting by LEDs and professional indoor lighting), Longvic (lamps), Miribel (outdoor lighting), Nevers (professional indoor lighting).

Germany
Philips Germany was founded in 1926 in Berlin. Now its headquarters is located in Hamburg. Over 4900 people are employed in Germany.

 Hamburg
 Distribution center of the divisions Healthcare, Consumer Lifestyle, and Lighting.
 Philips Medical Systems DMC.
 Philips Innovative Technologies, Research Laboratories.
 Aachen
 Philips Innovative Technologies.
 Philips Innovation Services.
 Böblingen
 Philips Medical Systems, patient monitoring systems.
 Herrsching
 Philips Respironics.
 Ulm
 Philips Photonics, development and manufacture of vertical laser diodes (VCSELs) and photodiodes for sensing and data communication.

Greece
Philips' Greece is headquartered in Halandri, Attica. As of 2012, Philips has no manufacturing plants in Greece, although previously there have been audio, lighting and telecommunications factories.

Italy
Philips founded its Italian subsidiary in 1923, basing it in Milan where it still operates. After the closure of the company's industrial operations, mainly manufacturing TVs in Monza and conventional lightbulbs near Turin, Philips Italia exists currently for commercial activities only.

Hungary
Philips founded PACH (Philips Assembly Centre Hungary) in 1992, producing televisions and consumer electronics in Székesfehérvár. After TPV entering the Philips TV business, the factory was moved under TP Vision, the new joint-venture company in 2011. Products have been transferred to Poland and China and factory was closed in 2013.

By Philips acquiring PLI in 2007 another Hungarian Philips factory emerged in Tamási, producing lamps under the name of Philips IPSC Tamási, later Philips Lighting. The factory was renamed to Signify in 2017, still producing Philips lighting products.

Poland
Philips' operations in Poland include: a European financial and accounting centre in Łódź; Philips Lighting facilities in Bielsko-Biała, Piła, and Kętrzyn; and a Philips Domestic Appliances facility in Białystok.

Portugal
Philips started business in Portugal in 1927, as "Philips Portuguesa S.A.R.L.". Currently, Philips Portuguesa S.A. is headquartered in Oeiras near Lisbon. There were three Philips factories in Portugal: the FAPAE lamp factory in Lisbon; the Carnaxide magnetic-core memory factory near Lisbon, where the Philips Service organization was also based; and the Ovar factory in northern Portugal making camera components and remote control devices. The company still operates in Portugal with divisions for commercial lighting, medical systems and domestic appliances.

Sweden
Philips Sweden has two main sites, Kista, Stockholm County, with regional sales, marketing and a customer support organization and Solna, Stockholm County, with the main office of the mammography division.

United Kingdom
Philips UK has its headquarters in Guildford. The company employs over 2,500 people nationwide.

 Philips Healthcare Informatics, Belfast develops healthcare software products.
 Philips Consumer Products, Guildford provides sales and marketing for televisions, including High Definition televisions, DVD recorders, hi-fi and portable audio, CD recorders, PC peripherals, cordless telephones, home and kitchen appliances, personal care (shavers, hair dryers, body beauty and oral hygiene ).
 Philips Dictation Systems, Colchester.
 Philips Lighting: sales from Guildford and manufacture in Hamilton.
 Philips Healthcare, Guildford. Sales and technical support for X-ray, ultrasound, nuclear medicine, patient monitoring, magnetic resonance, computed tomography, and resuscitation products.
 Philips Research Laboratories, Cambridge (Until 2008 based in Redhill, Surrey. Originally these were the Mullard Research Laboratories.)

In the past, Philips UK also included:
 Consumer product manufacturing in Croydon
 Television Tube Manufacturing Mullard Simonstone
 Philips Business Communications, Cambridge: offered voice and data communications products, specialising in Customer Relationship Management (CRM) applications, IP Telephony, data networking, voice processing, command and control systems and cordless and mobile telephony. In 2006 the business was placed into a 60/40 joint venture with NEC. NEC later acquired 100 per cent ownership and the business was renamed NEC Unified Solutions.
 Philips Electronics Blackburn; vacuum tubes, capacitors, delay-lines, Laserdiscs, CDs.
 Philips Domestic Appliances Hastings: Design and Production of Electric kettles, Fan Heaters plus former EKCO brand "Thermotube" Tubular Heaters and "Hostess" Domestic Food Warming Trolleys.
 Mullard Southampton and Hazel Grove, Stockport. Originally brought together as a joint venture between Mullard and GEC as Associated Semiconductor Manufacturers. They developed and manufactured rectifiers, diodes, transistors, integrated circuits and electro-optical devices. These became Philips Semiconductors before becoming part of NXP.
 London Carriers, logistics and transport division.
 Mullard Equipment Limited (MEL) which produced products for the military
 Ada (Halifax) Ltd, maker of washing machines and spin driers, refrigerators
 Pye TVT Ltd of Cambridge
 Pye Telecommunications Ltd of Cambridge
 TMC Limited of Malmesbury

North America

Canada

Philips Canada was founded in 1941 when it acquired Small Electric Motors Limited. It is well known in medical systems for diagnosis and therapy, lighting technologies, shavers, and consumer electronics.

The Canadian headquarters are located in Markham, Ontario.

For several years, Philips manufactured lighting products in two Canadian factories. The London, Ontario, plant opened in 1971. It produced A19 lamps (including the "Royale" long life bulbs), PAR38 lamps and T19 lamps (originally a Westinghouse lamp shape). Philips closed the factory in May 2003. The Trois-Rivières, Quebec plant was a Westinghouse facility which Philips continued to run it after buying Westinghouse's lamp division in 1983. Philips closed this factory a few years later, in the late 1980s.

Mexico
Philips Mexico Commercial SA de CV is headquartered in Mexico City. This entity was incorporated in FY2016 to sales consumer lifestyle and healthcare portfolios in the market.

United States

Philips' Electronics North American headquarters is in Cambridge, Massachusetts. Philips Lighting has its corporate office in Somerset, New Jersey; with manufacturing plants in Danville, Kentucky; Salina, Kansas; Dallas and Paris, Texas and distribution centers in Mountain Top, Pennsylvania; El Paso, Texas; Ontario, California; and Memphis, Tennessee. Philips Healthcare is headquartered in Cambridge, Massachusetts, and operates a health-tech hub in Nashville, Tennessee, with over 1,000 jobs. The North American sales organization is based in Bothell, Washington. There are also manufacturing facilities in Bothell, Washington; Baltimore, Maryland; Cleveland, Ohio; Foster City, California; Gainesville, Florida; Milpitas, California; and Reedsville, Pennsylvania. Philips Healthcare also formerly had a factory in Knoxville, Tennessee. Philips Consumer Lifestyle has its corporate office in Stamford, Connecticut.  Philips Lighting has a Color Kinetics office in Burlington, Massachusetts. Philips Research North American headquarters is in Cambridge, Massachusetts.

In 2007, Philips entered into a definitive merger agreement with North American luminaires company Genlyte Group Incorporated, which provides the company with a leading position in the North American luminaires (also known as "lighting fixtures"), controls and related products for a wide variety of applications, including solid state lighting. The company also acquired Respironics, which was a significant gain for its healthcare sector. On 21 February 2008, Philips completed the acquisition of Baltimore, Maryland-based VISICU. VISICU was the creator of the eICU concept of the use of Telemedicine from a centralized facility to monitor and care for ICU patients.

In April 2020, the United States Department of Health & Human Services (HHS) entered into a contract with Philips Respironics for 43,000 bundled Trilogy Evo Universal ventilator (EV300) hospital ventilators. This included the production and delivery of ventilators to the Strategic National Stockpile—about  156,000 by the end of August 2020 and 187,000 more by the end of 2020. During the COVID-19 pandemic, beginning in March 2020, in response to an international demand, Philips increased production of the ventilators fourfold within five months. Production lines were added in the United States with employees working around the clock in factories producing ventilators, in Western Pennsylvania and California, for example.

In March 2020, ProPublica published a series of articles on the Philips ventilator contract as negotiated by trade adviser Peter Navarro. In response to the ProPublica series, in August, the United States House of Representatives undertook a "congressional investigation" into the acquisition of the Philips ventilators. The lawmakers investigation found "evidence of fraud, waste and abuse".—the deal negotiated by Navarro had resulted in an over-payment to Philips by the US government of "hundreds of millions".

Oceania

Australia and New Zealand
Philips Australia was founded in 1927 and is headquartered in North Ryde, New South Wales, and also manages the New Zealand operation from there. The company currently employs around 800 people. Regional sales and support offices are located in Melbourne, Brisbane, Adelaide, Perth and Auckland.

Current activities include: Philips Healthcare (also responsible for New Zealand operations); Philips Lighting (also responsible for New Zealand operations); Philips Oral Healthcare, Philips Professional Dictation Solutions, Philips Professional Display Solutions, Philips AVENT Professional, Philips Consumer Lifestyle (also responsible for New Zealand operations); Philips Sleep & Respiratory Care (formerly Respironics), with its ever-increasing national network of Sleepeasy Centres; Philips Dynalite (Lighting Control systems, acquired in 2009, global design and manufacturing centre) and Philips Selecon NZ (Lighting Entertainment product design and manufacture).

South America

Brazil
Philips do Brasil was founded in 1924 in Rio de Janeiro. In 1929, Philips started to sell radio receivers. In the 1930s, Philips was making its light bulbs and radio receivers in Brazil. From 1939 to 1945, World War II forced Brazilian branch of Philips to sell bicycles, refrigerators and insecticides. After the war, Philips had a great industrial expansion in Brazil, and was among the first groups to establish in Manaus Free Zone. In the 1970s, Philips Records was a major player in Brazil recording industry. Nowadays, Philips do Brasil is one of the largest foreign-owned companies in Brazil. Philips uses the brand Walita for domestic appliances in Brazil.

Colour television

Colour television was introduced in South America by then CEO, Cor Dillen.

Former operations
Philips subsidiary  manufactured pharmaceuticals for human and veterinary use and products for crop protection. Duphar was sold to Solvay in 1990. In subsequent years, Solvay sold off all divisions to other companies (crop protection to UniRoyal, now Chemtura, the veterinary division to Fort Dodge, a division of Wyeth, and the pharmaceutical division to Abbott Laboratories).

PolyGram, Philips' music television and movies division, was sold to Seagram in 1998; merged into Universal Music Group. Philips Records continues to operate as record label of UMG, its name licensed from its former parent.

In 1980, Philips acquired Marantz, a company renowned for high-end audio and video products, based at Kanagawa, Japan. In 2002, Marantz Japan merged with Denon to form D&M Holdings and Philips sold its remaining stake in D&M Holdings in 2008.

Origin, now part of Atos Origin, is a former division of Philips.

ASM Lithography is a spin-off from a division of Philips.

Hollandse Signaalapparaten was a manufacturer of military electronics. The business was sold to Thomson-CSF in 1990 and is now Thales Nederland.

NXP Semiconductors, formerly known as Philips Semiconductors, was sold a consortium of private equity investors in 2006. On 6 August 2010, NXP completed its IPO, with shares trading on NASDAQ.

Ignis, of Comerio, in the province of Varese, Italy, produced washing machines, dishwashers and microwave ovens, was one of the leading companies in the domestic appliance market, holding a 38% share in 1960. In 1970, 50% of the company's capital was taken over by Philips, which acquired full control in 1972. Ignis was in those years, after Zanussi, the second largest domestic appliance manufacturer, and in 1973 its factories numbered over 10,000 employees only in Italy. With the transfer of ownership to the Dutch multinational, the corporate name of the company was changed, which became "IRE SpA" (Industrie Riunite Eurodomestici). Thereafter Philips used to sell major household appliances (whitegoods) under the name Philips. After selling the Major Domestic Appliances division to Whirlpool Corporation it changed from Philips Whirlpool to Whirlpool Philips and finally to just  Whirlpool. Whirlpool bought a 53% stake in Philips' major appliance operations to form Whirlpool International. Whirlpool bought Philips' remaining interest in Whirlpool International in 1991.

Philips Cryogenics was split off in 1990 to form the Stirling Cryogenics BV, Netherlands. This company is still active in the development and manufacturing of Stirling cryocoolers and cryogenic cooling systems.

North American Philips distributed AKG Acoustics products under the AKG of America, Philips Audio/Video, Norelco and AKG Acoustics Inc. branding until AKG set up its North American division in San Leandro, California, in 1985.  (AKG's North American division has since moved to Northridge, California.)

Polymer Vision was a Philips spin-off that manufactured a flexible e-ink display screen. The company was acquired by Taiwanese contract electronics manufacturer Wistron in 2009 and it was shut down in 2012, after repeated failed attempts to find a potential buyer.

Products

Philips' core products are consumer electronics and electrical products (including small domestic appliances, shavers, beauty appliances, mother and childcare appliances, electric toothbrushes and coffee makers (products like Smart Phones, audio equipment, Blu-ray players, computer accessories and televisions are sold under license); and healthcare products (including CT scanners, ECG equipment, mammography equipment, monitoring equipment, MRI scanners, radiography equipment, resuscitation equipment, ultrasound equipment and X-ray equipment);

In January 2020 Philips announced that it is looking to sell its domestic appliances division, which includes products like coffee machines, air purifiers and airfryers.

Lighting products

 Professional indoor luminaires
 Professional outdoor luminaires
 Professional lamps
 Lighting controls and control systems
 Digital projection lights
 Horticulture lighting
 Solar LED lights
 Smart office lighting systems
 Smart retail lighting systems
 Smart city lighting systems
 Home lamps
 Home fixtures
 Home systems (branded as Philips Hue)
 Automotive Lighting

Audio products

 Hi-fi systems
 Wireless speakers
 Radio systems
 Docking stations
 Headphones
 DJ mixers
 Alarm clocks

Healthcare products

Philips healthcare products include:

Clinical informatics
 Cardiology informatics (IntelliSpace Cardiovascular, Xcelera)
 Enterprise Imaging Informatics (IntelliSpace PACS, XIRIS)
 IntelliSpace family of solutions

Imaging systems
 Cardio/Vascular X-Ray Wires and Catheters (Verrata)
 Computed tomography (CT)
 Fluoroscopy
 Magnetic resonance imaging (MRI)
Mammography
 Mobile C-Arms
 Nuclear medicine
 PET (Positron emission tomography)
 PET/CT
 Radiography
 Radiation oncology Systemsroots
 Ultrasound

Diagnostic monitoring
 Diagnostic ECG

Defibrillators
 Accessories
 Equipment
 Software

Consumer

 Philips AVENTil

Patient care and clinical informatics

 Anesthetic gas monitoring
 Blood pressure
 Capnography
 D.M.E.
 Diagnostic sleep testing
 ECG
 Enterprise patient informatics solutions
OB TraceVue
Compurecord
ICIP
eICU program
Emergin
 Hemodynamic
 IntelliSpace Cardiovascular
 IntelliSpace PACS
 IntelliSpace portal
 Multi-measurement servers
 Neurophedeoiles
 Pulse oximetry
 Tasy
 Temperature
 Transcutaneous gases
 Ventilation
 ViewForum
 Xcelera
 XIRIS
 Xper Information Management

Logo evolution
The famous Philips logo with the stars and waves was designed by Dutch architect Louis Kalff (1897–1976), who stated that the emblem had been created as a coincidence as he did not know how a radio system worked.

Slogans 
 Trust In Philips Is Worldwide (1960-1974)
 Simply Years Ahead (1974-1981)
 We Want You To Have The Best (1981-1985)
 Take a Closer Look (1985-1995)
 Let's Make Things Better (1995–2004)
 Sense & Simplicity (2004–2013)
 Innovation & You (2013–present)

Sponsorships

In 1913, in celebration of the 100th anniversary of the liberation of the Netherlands, Philips founded Philips Sports Vereniging (Philips Sports Club, now commonly known as PSV). The club is active in numerous sports but is now best known for its football team, PSV Eindhoven, and swimming team. Philips owns the naming rights to Philips Stadium in Eindhoven, which is the home ground of PSV Eindhoven.

Outside of the Netherlands, Philips sponsors and has sponsored numerous sports clubs, sports facilities and events. In November 2008, Philips renewed and extended its F1 partnership with AT&T Williams. Philips owns the naming rights to the Philips Championship, the premier basketball league in Australia, traditionally known as the National Basketball League. From 1988 to 1993, Philips was the principal sponsor of the Australian rugby league team The Balmain Tigers and Indonesian football club side Persiba Balikpapan. From 1998 to 2000, Philips sponsored the Winston Cup No. 7 entry for Geoff Bodine Racing, later Ultra Motorsports, for drivers Geoff Bodine and Michael Waltrip. From 1999 to 2018, Philips held the naming rights to Philips Arena in Atlanta, home of the Atlanta Hawks of the National Basketball Association and former home of the defunct Atlanta Thrashers of the National Hockey League.

Outside of sports, Philips sponsors the international Philips Monsters of Rock festival.

Environmental record

Circular economy
Philips and its CEO, Frans van Houten, hold several global leadership positions in advancing the circular economy, including as a founding member and co-chair of the board of directors for the Platform for Accelerating the Circular Economy (PACE), applying circular approaches in its capital equipment business, and as a global partner of the Ellen MacArthur Foundation.

Planned obsolescence 
Philips was a member of the Phoebus cartel along with Osram, Tungsram, Associated Electrical Industries, Compagnie des Lampes, International General Electric, and the GE Overseas Group, holding shares in the Swiss corporation proportional to their lamp sales. The cartel lowered operational costs and worked to standardize the life expectancy of light bulbs at 1,000 hours (down from 2,500 hours), and raised prices without fear of competition. The cartel tested their bulbs and fined manufacturers for bulbs that lasted more than 1,000 hours.

Green initiatives
Philips also runs the EcoVision initiative, which commits to a number of environmentally positive improvements, focusing on energy efficiency.

Also, Philips marks its "green" products with the Philips Green Logo, identifying them as products that have a significantly better environmental performance than their competitors or predecessors.

L-Prize competition
In 2011, Philips won a $10 million cash prize from the US Department of Energy for winning its L-Prize competition, to produce a high-efficiency, long operating life replacement for a standard 60-W incandescent lightbulb. The winning LED lightbulb, which was made available to consumers in April 2012, produces slightly more than 900 lumens at an input power of 10 W.

Greenpeace ranking
In Greenpeace's 2012 Guide to Greener Electronics that ranks electronics manufacturers on sustainability, climate and energy and how green their products are, Philips ranks 10th place with a score of 3.8/10. The company was the top scorer in the Energy section due to its energy advocacy work calling upon the EU to adopt a 30% reduction for greenhouse gas emissions by 2020. It is also praised for its new products which are free from PVC plastic and BFRs. However, the guide criticizes Philips' sourcing of fibres for paper, arguing it must develop a paper procurement policy which excludes suppliers involved in deforestation and illegal logging.

Philips have made some considerable progress since 2007 (when it was first ranked in this guide), in particular by supporting the Individual Producer Responsibility principle, which means that the company is accepting the responsibility for the toxic impacts of its products on e-waste dumps around the world.

Publications
 A. Heerding: The origin of the Dutch incandescent lamp industry. (Vol. 1 of The history of N.V. Philips gloeilampenfabriek). Cambridge, Cambridge University Press, 1986. 
 A. Heerding: A company of many parts. (Vol. 2 of The history of N.V. Philips' gloeilampenfabrieken). Cambridge, Cambridge University Press, 1988. 
 I.J. Blanken: The development of N.V. Philips' Gloeilampenfabrieken into a major electrical group. Zaltbommel, European Library, 1999. (Vol. 3 of The history of Philips Electronics N.V.). 
 I.J. Blanken: Under German rule. Zaltbommel, European Library, 1999. (Vol. 4 of The history of Philips Electronics N.V).

References

External links

 
 

 
Electronics companies established in 1891
Companies listed on Euronext Amsterdam
Consumer electronics brands
Display technology companies
Dutch brands
Eindhoven
Guitar amplification tubes
Headphones manufacturers
Home appliance manufacturers of the Netherlands
Kitchenware brands
Light-emitting diode manufacturers
Lighting brands
Medical technology companies of the Netherlands
Mobile phone manufacturers
Personal care brands
Portable audio player manufacturers
Vacuum tubes
Videotelephony
Dutch companies established in 1891
Radio manufacturers